Orthodontopsis is a genus of moss in the family Orthodontiaceae. It contains two species:
 Orthodontopsis bardunovii, Ignatov & B.C.Tan
 Orthodontopsis lignicola, Ignatov & B.C.Tan

References

Moss genera
Rhizogoniales
Taxonomy articles created by Polbot